Sammach may refer to:
 Sammach-e Korg
 Sammach-e Mahmud
 Sammach-e Miru